Anthony Ettrick (15 November 1622 – 5 October 1703) was an English politician.

Personal life 
His son William Ettrick replaced him in Parliament.

References 

1622 births
1703 deaths
17th-century English politicians
English MPs 1685–1687
People from Wimborne Minster
People from Christchurch, Dorset
Tory MPs (pre-1834)